Eugene "Gene" Mangan (born 1936) is an Irish cyclist. He won the Rás Tailteann in 1955.

Early life
Mangan is a native of County Kerry. He is a distant cousin of John Mangan, who also won the Rás.

Career

Mangan joined Killorglin Cycling Club in 1952. In that year, and in 1953, he won the County Kerry Road Championship.

Mangan won the 1955 Rás Tailteann aged 18; he is still the youngest-ever winner.

In 1958 Rás he won the last four stages, setting a record that still stands. Mangan also won several races at the Irish National Cycling Championships.

Personal life
Mangan married Maeve of Glenbeigh Co.Kerry . He was honoured at an event at Áras an Uachtaráin in 2000.

References

1936 births
Irish male cyclists
Rás Tailteann winners
Sportspeople from County Kerry
Living people